"Soldier Boy" is a song written by Luther Dixon and Florence Greenberg and made famous by the girl group the Shirelles.

Background
Record executive Florence Greenberg, founder of Scepter Records (the Shirelles' record label), wrote the song and was originally titled "I'll Be True to You". The main frame of the song's lyrics make no mention of a soldier. It was only while recording at Bell Sound Studios that the Shirelles gave the song a much better title to reflect its narrative, the profession of someone's love for the titular soldier boy in which she promises to remain true to him while he's away. The song was released as a single by The Shirelles in 1962 and met with great success, topping the US Billboard Hot 100.

In popular culture
 The recording was used in the film The Wanderers (1979).
 The recording was used in the film Born on the Fourth of July (1989)
 Actress Brittany Murphy sings the song in the 2001 movie Riding in Cars with Boys. 
 The recording was used in the television series 11.22.63 (2016) episode 7 Soldier Boy

Charts

Cover versions
  "Soldier Boy" was covered by American country music artist Donna Fargo in 1991. Her version peaked at number 71 on the Billboard Hot Country Singles & Tracks chart.
 It was covered by Diane Renay in 1964.
 "Soldier Boy" was covered too by the Mexican children's group La Onda Vaselina in 1989, titled "Yo te esperaré" and adapted by the composer and Mexican singer Julissa.

References

Songs about soldiers
The Shirelles songs
Billboard Hot 100 number-one singles
Cashbox number-one singles
1962 songs
Songs written by Luther Dixon
Scepter Records singles
1962 singles
Donna Fargo songs